Brian O'Brien may refer to:
 Brian O'Brien (optical physicist) (1898–1992), American optical physicist and the founder of the Air Force Studies Board
 Brian O'Brien (space scientist) (1934–2020), Australian physicist and space scientist
 Brian O'Brien (rugby union) (1939–2023), Irish rugby union player and coach

See also
 Brian O'Brian, an Italian-American series of television shorts